Pamplona Airport is an airport in Pamplona, Navarra, Spain . It is between Noáin and Esquiroz. It is a public airport managed by AENA.

Airlines and destinations
The following airlines operate regular scheduled and charter flights at Pamplona Airport:

Public transport
From 6 November 2017, Line A of Pamplona City Transport connects the airport with the city center and the Renfe train station every hour.

Statistics

References

External links

Official website 

Airports in Navarre
Buildings and structures in Pamplona